Bossa Nova (also released as Return to Rio) is an album by American jazz trumpeter, composer and arranger Shorty Rogers, released on the Reprise label in 1962.

Reception

On All About Jazz Dave Rickert said: "Bossa Nova must have appeared fresh at the time—it was recorded in 1962, a year before the Brazilian music craze—but now seems buried in a pack of like-minded albums. Rogers did have the presence of mind to recruit a guitarist and a few percussionists to give the music an authentic flavor, and the music is earnestly played. However, bossa nova works best with a less rambunctious approach. Rogers never seemed capable of approaching anything delicately, and he overwhelms the melodies with brassy riffs. Not bad, but when you’re tempted to reach for a big band or a bossa nova record, Bossa Nova won’t come to mind in either case". On Allmusic, Scott Yanow noted: "The emphasis is on ensembles with occasional statements from Rogers but surprisingly little happens. The overall results are pleasant but a bit of a disappointment".

Track listing 
All compositions by Shorty Rogers except where noted.
 "Samba do Lorinho (Lorito's Samba)" - 2:07
 "Chega de Saudade (No More Sadness)" (Antônio Carlos Jobim, Vinícius de Moraes) - 2:17    
 "Samba Triste (Melancholy Samba)" (Billy Blanco, Baden Powell) - 2:55
 "Samba de Uma Nota So (One Note Samba)" (Jobim, Newton Mendonça) - 2:55
 "Pao de Assucar (Sugar Loaf)" - 5:03
 "Samba do Empashgi (Empashgi's Samba)" - 4:05
 "O Amor E a Rosa (Love Is a Rose)" (João Pernambuco, Antônio Maria) - 3:04
 "So Voce (Only You)" (Laurindo Almeida, Shorty Rogers) - 2:31
 "Chora Tua Tristeza (Cry Your Sadness)" (Oscar Castro-Neves) - 3:23
 "So Um Amor (Only One Love)" (Almeida, Rogers) - 1:47
 "O Menino Desce O Morro (Little Brown Boy)" (Vera Brazil) - 2:25

Personnel 
Shorty Rogers - flugelhorn, arranger, conductor
Joe Burnett, Ollie Mitchell - trumpet
Paul Horn, Bud Shank - alto saxophone, flute
Richard Leith, Kenneth Shroyer - trombone
Pete Jolly - piano
Joe Mondragon - bass
Laurindo Almeida - guitar
Larry Bunker - vibraphone
Milt Holland, Shelly Manne - drums
Emil Richards, Chico Guerrero - percussion

References 

Shorty Rogers albums
1962 albums
Reprise Records albums
Albums arranged by Shorty Rogers